Pleasant Hills is a census-designated place (CDP) in Hamilton County, Ohio, United States. The population was 950 at the 2020 census.

Geography
It lies north of Finneytown, between the city of Mount Healthy to the west and Wyoming to the east.

Demographics

References

Census-designated places in Hamilton County, Ohio
Census-designated places in Ohio